This is a list of active and extinct volcanoes in Azerbaijan.

References 

Azerbaijan
Volcanoes of Azerbaijan
Volcanioes